Elle Anderson (born March 29, 1988) is a retired American road cyclist and cyclo-cross cyclist. She represented her nation in the women's elite event at the 2016 UCI Cyclo-cross World Championships in Heusden-Zolder.

In September 2019, Anderson announced her retirement from cyclo-cross to become the head coach for the Killington Mountain School's endurance cycling program in Vermont.

References

External links
 

1988 births
Living people
Cyclo-cross cyclists
American female cyclists
Cyclists from Vermont
21st-century American women